An architectural model is a type of scale model made to study aspects of an architectural design or to communicate design intent. They can be made from a variety of materials such as paper, plaster, plastic, resin, wood, glass and metal. Models are constructed using either traditional handcraft techniques and tools, or newer technologies such as Stereolithography, Fused Deposition Modelling and Selective Laser Sintering.

History
The usage of architectural models can be dated to pre-history. Some of the oldest-standing models were found in Malta, such as at Tarxien Temples, and now reside at the archaeology museum in Valletta.

Purpose

Architectural models are used by architects for a range of purposes:
 Ad hoc or "sketch" models are sometimes made to study the interaction of volumes, different viewpoints, or concepts during the design process. They may also be useful in explaining a complicated or unusual design to builders, or as a focus for discussion between designers and consultants such as architects, engineers, and town planners.
 Presentation models can be used to exhibit, visualize or sell a final design. A model is also used as show pieces, for instance, as a feature in the reception of a building, or as part of a museum exhibition such as scale replicas of historical buildings.

Types of models include:
 Exterior models are models of buildings that usually include some landscaping or civic spaces around the building.
 Interior models are models showing interior space planning, finishes, colors, furniture, and beautification.
 Landscaping design models are models of landscape design and development, representing features such as walkways, small bridges, pergolas, vegetation patterns, and beautification. Landscaping design models usually represent public spaces and, in some cases, include buildings as well.
 Urban models are models typically built at a much smaller scale (starting from 1:500 and less, 1:700, 1:1000, 1:1200, 1:2000, 1:20 000), representing several city blocks, even a whole town or village, large resort, campus, industrial facility, military base and so on. Urban models are a vital tool for town/city planning and development. Urban models of large urban areas are displayed at museums such as the Shanghai Urban Planning Exhibition Center, Queens Museum in New York, the Beijing Planning Exhibition Hall, and the Singapore City Gallery.
 Engineering and construction models show isolated building/structure elements and components and their interaction.

Virtual modeling
Buildings are increasingly designed in software with CAD (computer-aided design) systems. Early virtual modelling involved the fixing of arbitrary lines and points in virtual space, mainly to produce technical drawings. Modern packages include advanced features such as databases of components, automated engineering calculations, visual fly-throughs, dynamic reflections, and accurate textures and colours.

As an extension to CAD (computer-aided design) and BIM (building information modelling), virtual reality architectural sessions are also being adopted at increasingly faster rates. As this technology enables participants to be immersed in a 1:1 scale model, essentially experiencing the building before it is even being built.

List of CAD and BIM software 

 Autodesk Revit
 AutoCAD
 Rhinoceros 3D
 SketchUp
 ARCHICAD
 Vectorworks

Materials
Rough study models can be made quickly using cardboard, wooden blocks, polystyrene, foam, foam boards and, other materials. Such models are an efficient design tool for the three-dimensional understanding of a structure, space, or form, used by architects, interior designers, and exhibit designers.

Common materials used for centuries in the architectural model building were card stock, balsa wood, basswood, and other woods. Modern professional architectural model builders are taking advantage of twenty-first-century materials, such as Taskboard (a flexible and lightweight wood/fiberboard), plastics, wooden and wooden-plastic composites, foams, foam board, and urethane compounds.
 
Several companies produce ready-made pieces for structural components (e.g. girders, beams), siding, furniture, figures (people), vehicles, trees, bushes, and other features which are found in the models. Features such as vehicles, people figurines, trees, streetlights and others are called "scenery elements" and serve not only to beautify the model but also to help the observer to obtain a correct feel of the scale and proportions represented by the model.

Increasingly, rapid prototyping techniques such as 3D printing and CNC routing are used to automatically construct models straight from CAD plans.

Cork models

A cork model is an architectural model made predominantly of cork. The art of cork modelling is also called phelloplasty (Greek φελλός phellos, cork).

Cork was already used in the 16th century in Naples to make Christmas cribs. Crib making became extremely popular there in the 18th and early 19th centuries.

The invention of architectural models made of cork was (self-)attributed to Augusto Rosa (1738-1784) but Giovanni Altieri (documented 1766/67-1790) and above all Antonio Chichi (1743-1816, https://it.wikipedia.org/wiki/File:Tempel_des_Portunus_Gotha.JPG) were already active in Rome as manufacturers of cork models.

Chichi's models were copied with great success by Carl May (1747-1822, https://de.wikipedia.org/wiki/Carl_May) and his son Georg Heinrich May (1790–1853).

Other artists can be mentioned like Luigi Carotti (Rome), Carlo Lucangeli (1747-1812, Rome, Naples), Domenico Padiglione and his sons Agostino and Felice (Naples) and Auguste Pelet (1785-1865, Nîmes). In Marseille, several scale models were made representing archaeological digs by Hippolyte Augier (1830-1889) (Marseille History Museum / Musée d’Histoire de Marseille) or Stanislas Clastrier (1857-1925, https://fr.wikipedia.org/wiki/Stanislas_Clastrier).

Dieter Cöllen is a contemporary phelloplastic.

Collections

Many cork models of classical monuments in Italy were made and sold to tourists during their Grand Tour. Cork, especially when carefully painted, was ideal to reproduce the weathered look of wall surfaces.

As a rule, they were produced on a large scale (the Colosseum in Aschaffenburg is three meters long and one meter high) and with great, almost scientific precision.

Cork models were highly esteemed in the princely courts of the 18th century. They were also acquired for their scientific value by schools of architecture in the late 18th/early 19th century, or institutions like the Society of Antiquaries of London and the British Museum thus introducing the general public to ancient architecture.

Despite their fragility, cork models have often survived better than wooden models threatened by wood-destroying insects.

Apart from kings and princes, cork models were collected by people such as Filippo Farsetti (1703-1774) in Venice, Pierre Gaspard Marie Grimod d'Orsay (1748-1809) or the architect Louis-François Cassas in France, Charles Townley or  Sir J. Soane in London, who turned his home into a museum, Sir John Soane's Museum, housing a collection of 14 models in cork of Roman and Greek buildings.

Chichi's cork models can be found at the Imperial Academy of Arts in St. Petersburg (34 models made around 1774); Schloss Wilhelmshöhe, Kassel (33 models made 1777–1782); Hessisches Landesmuseum Darmstadt (26 models acquired 1790/91); and the Herzogliches Museum Gotha (12 models, acquired after 1777/78. See Wikipedia in German).

The largest collection of cork models by Carl May with 54 pieces (after war losses) is in Aschaffenburg (Schloss Johannisburg), another large collection of his models is in the Staatliches Museum Schwerin.

In France, the Musée des Antiquités Nationales à Saint-Germain-en-Laye, has works by Rosa, Lucandeli or Pelet. 
The Musée archéologique de Nîmes (https://fr.wikipedia.org/wiki/Mus%C3%A9e_arch%C3%A9ologique_de_N%C3%AEmes), and the Marseille History Museum also have cork models.

Modern cork models of antique buildings by Dieter Cöllen are exhibited in the Praetorium in Cologne.

Scales

Architectural models are being constructed at much smaller scale than their 1:1 counterpart.

The scales and their architectural use is broadly as follows:
1:1	Full (or real) size for	details
1:2	Details
1:5	Details
1:10	Interior spaces/furniture
1:20	Interior spaces/furniture
1:50	Interior spaces/detailed floor plans/different floor levels
1:100	Building plans/layouts
1:200	Building plans/layouts
1:500	Building layouts/site plans
1:1000	Urban scale for site or location plans
1:1250	Site plans
1:2500	Site plans/city maps
1:5000	City maps/Island

Sometimes model railroad scales such as 1:160 and 1:87 are used due to ready availability of commercial figures, vehicles and trees in those scales, and models of large buildings are most often built in approximately that range of scales due to size considerations.

See also

Architectural rendering
Maquette
Origamic architecture (OA)
Scale model
Superquick

References

External links

 What is the role of Revit 3D modelling in construction?, Role of Architectural model in construction

Model
Model
Crafts
Scale modeling